Corus collaris is a species of beetle in the family Cerambycidae. It was described by Chevrolat in 1856. It feeds on Acacia plants.

References

collaris
Beetles described in 1856